Tewea, better known by his English name Captain Jacobs, (d. September 8, 1756) was a Lenape chief during the French and Indian War. Jacobs received his English name from a Pennsylvanian settler named Arthur Buchanan, who thought the chief resembled a "burly German in Cumberland County."

British colonial settlement

Lewistown, Pennsylvania is located where there once was a considerable Lenape settlement, at the confluence of the Kishacoquillas Creek and the Juniata River. It was in 1754 that British colonists, led by Buchanan, came to the area. Captain Jacobs, being a Lenape chief, was at first reluctant to sell any of the nearby land to the colonists. With the assistance of a keg of rum, a few trinkets, and some tobacco, Buchanan convinced Jacobs to give them the land. Captain Jacobs initially professed great friendship toward the British, but was swayed by the French to think otherwise. As the number of British colonists grew, so did Jacobs' dissatisfaction with them. Without notice or incident, the Lenape destroyed their own settlement and left the area, which the colonists noted with caution.

French and Indian War

During the French and Indian War, Jacobs led Lenape warriors against British colonial settlements in multiple raids following Braddock's defeat throughout the valleys of Central Pennsylvania. Jacobs boasted that he "could take any fort that would catch fire, and would make peace with the English when they had learned him to make gunpowder." Jacobs participated in the burning of Fort Granville under the direction of the French commander. The Pennsylvania Provincial Council took months to organize an expedition in hopes of neutralizing both Shingas and Captain Jacobs.

Kittanning Expedition 

On the morning of September 8, 1756, Colonel John Armstrong Sr. led a force of 307 Pennsylvanians provincials to attack the Lenape village of Kittanning in hopes of disrupting raids against frontier settlements. Chief Shingas was away during the battle, so Jacobs took command and fought Armstrong's men from his log cabin, "his squaw assisting in loading his guns." Hugh Gibson, who was a captive at Kittanning at that time, reports that when Armstrong's men threatened to set fire to his house if Jacobs would not surrender, Jacobs replied that "he could eat fire." 

Gibson also asserts that Jacobs killed fourteen of Armstrong's men, adding that "In this contest, Jacobs received seven balls (bullets) before he was brought upon his knees." One of Armstrong's soldiers, John Ferguson, managed to set fire to Jacobs' house. Jacobs and his family remained inside until the magazine erupted and their guns took fire. When they emerged, Jacobs' spouse was killed first, followed by Jacobs himself, and then their son.  Captain Jacobs was scalped and his head carried back to Philadelphia where Armstrong received 600 pounds in bounty for it. 

In January 1758 Pennsylvania proprietor Thomas Penn wrote to Richard Peters mentioning the Kittanning Expedition, and adding that "I also received...the scalp of Captain Jacobs for which I am greatly obliged to Colonel Armstrong to whom it's a valuable trophy. I have thought of sending it to the British Museum with a plate engraved giving an account of the action. It is unknown what happened to the scalp.

See also 

 Kittanning (village)
 Kittanning Expedition
 Tamaqua (Lenape chief)
 Pisquetomen
 Nenatcheehunt

References

1756 deaths
Indigenous people of the French and Indian War
Lenape people
Native American leaders
Native American people from Pennsylvania
Native American people of the Indian Wars
Year of birth unknown